Teams made up of athletes representing different National Olympic Committees (NOCs), called mixed-NOCs teams, participated in the 2012 Winter Youth Olympics. These teams participated in events composed entirely of mixed-NOCs teams. When a mixed-NOCs team won a medal, the Olympic flag was raised rather than a national flag; when a mixed-NOCs team won gold, the Olympic anthem would be played instead of national anthems.

Background  
The concept of mixed-NOCs was introduced in the 2010 Summer Youth Olympics, in which athletes from different nations would compete in the same team, often representing their continent. This is in contrast to the Mixed team (IOC code: ZZX) found at early senior Olympic Games.

Medal summary  
The following medal summary lists all nations whose athletes won a medal while competing for a mixed-NOCs team. If there is more than one athlete from the same nation on a medal-winning team, only one medal of that colour is credited, so therefore in this medal summary China are credited with only one gold rather than two for their participation in the gold-winning short track speed skating team.

A total of 15 National Olympic Committees, including hosts Austria, had at least one athlete representing a mixed-NOCs team win a medal.

Curling

Figure Skating

Short Track Speed Skating

See also
 2012 Winter Youth Olympics medal table
Mixed-NOCs at the Youth Olympics

Nations at the 2012 Winter Youth Olympics
2012 Winter Youth Olympics
Mixed teams at the Youth Olympics